Celeste may refer to:

Geography
 Mount Celeste, unofficial name of a mountain on Vancouver Island, British Columbia, Canada
 Celeste, Texas, a rural city in North Texas
 Celeste High School, public high school located in the city of Celeste, Texas
 Celeste Lake, Bolivia
 Celeste River, Costa Rica
 Celeste Center, a multipurpose arena in Columbus, Ohio

Film, books and games
 Céleste (1980 film), a German film about the life of Marcel Proust
 Celeste (2018 film), an Australian film
 Celeste, a 2004 novel in the Gemini series of V. C. Andrews novels, ghostwritten by Andrew Neiderman
 Celeste (video game), a 2018 puzzle platforming video game

Music
 Celeste (singer), American-born British singer-songwriter
 Celeste Cruz, half of American pop duo Daphne and Celeste
 Celeste Johnson, professionally known as Celeste, American performer in Italy
 Celeste (band), a post-metal band from Lyon, France
 Celeste (album), a 2012 album by My Tiger My Timing
 "Celeste" (song), a 2012 Italian-language song by Laura Pausini
 "Celeste", a song by Donovan from the album Sunshine Superman
 Celesta, a musical instrument also known as a celeste
 Celeste pedal, a type of pedal on some early pianos
  (French: 'heavenly voice'), a pipe organ stop

Other uses
 Celeste (color), a pale turquoise shade of blue
 Celeste (frozen pizza), brand of frozen pizza owned by Pinnacle Foods and widely referred to as Mama Celeste
 Mitsubishi Celeste, a Japanese car
 Tropical Storm Celeste, tropical cyclones named Celeste

See also 
 Celeste (name), a list of people with the given name or surname
 Celestia (name)